Martin Klein (born 2 July 1984, in Brno) is a Czech football defender.

Club career
Klein started his career playing for Boby Brno, then he joined Sparta Prague in 2000. On 27 February 2002, he scored a goal in a 1–2 loss against Panathinaikos in the 2001–02 UEFA Champions League, at the age of 17 years and 241 days. Later on, he transferred to Teplice, then he joined Konyaspor and Ferencvárosi, before returning to Teplice in 2013.

In February 2014, Klein signed for Kazakhstan Premier League side FC Kaisar.

In the summer 2019, Klein joined SK Rakovník. On 30 December 2019, Klein moved to German Landesliga Bayern-Nordost club Kickers Selb.

International career
Klein was part of Czech Republic U-21. On 5 June 2009, he made his debut for the Czech Republic national team in a friendly match against Malta, which ended in a 1–0 win.

Honours
Sparta Prague
Czech First League (2): 2000–01, 2002–03

Teplice
Czech Cup (1): 2008–09

Ferencváros
Hungarian League Cup (1): 2012–13

References

External links
 
 
 
 
 

1984 births
Living people
Footballers from Brno
Czech footballers
Association football defenders
Czech Republic youth international footballers
Czech Republic under-21 international footballers
Czech Republic international footballers
AC Sparta Prague players
FK Teplice players
Konyaspor footballers
Ferencvárosi TC footballers
FC Kaisar players
FC Zhetysu players
Birkirkara F.C. players
Czech First League players
Süper Lig players
Nemzeti Bajnokság I players
Kazakhstan Premier League players
Maltese Premier League players
Czech expatriate footballers
Expatriate footballers in Turkey
Expatriate footballers in Hungary
Expatriate footballers in Kazakhstan
Expatriate footballers in Malta
Expatriate footballers in Germany
Czech expatriate sportspeople in Turkey
Czech expatriate sportspeople in Hungary
Czech expatriate sportspeople in Kazakhstan
Czech expatriate sportspeople in Germany